Hoeven may refer to:
 Charles B. Hoeven (1895–1980), American politician
 John Hoeven (born 1957), United States Senator from North Dakota
Hoeven may also refer to several locations in the Netherlands:
 Hoeven, a town in Halderberge
 Hoeven, Gemert-Bakel
 Hoeven, Sint Anthonis
 Hoeven, Limburg